Abyzovo (Abıź) is a rural locality (a selo) in Karaidelsky Selsoviet of Karaidelsky District, Bashkortostan, Russia. The population was 905 as of 2010. There are 34 streets.

Geography 
Abyzovo is located 2 km east of Karaidel (the district's administrative centre) by road. Karaidel is the nearest rural locality.

Ethnicity 
The village is inhabited by Russians and Bashkirs.

References 

Rural localities in Karaidelsky District